Lexi Underwood is an American actress and singer, best known for her role as Pearl Warren in Little Fires Everywhere. She also played Athena in Will vs the Future, a comedic science fiction series created and executive produced by Tim McKeon and Kevin Seccia, and directed by Joe Nussbaum.

Career
Underwood made her professional theatrical debut in November 2013 at age ten, at the Ford's Theatre in Washington, D.C. in their acclaimed production of Charles Dickens’ A Christmas Carol as Want/Urchin Girl. 

On December 15, 2014, Underwood performed in Mister Magoo's Christmas Carol for the Actors Fund of America's one night only benefit concert, which was directed by Peter Flynn and musically directed by John McDaniel. In November 2015, Underwood was cast as Young Nala in the Disney Theatrical Productions’ The Lion King. Underwood performed with the North-American Touring Company from January to August 2015 and covered Broadway in the same role.

On October 14, 2014, Underwood made her television debut on the CBS series Person of Interest in the role of Queen Bee. Underwood went on to appear in Code Black as Emily Campbell, Dr. Campbell's daughter, Henry Danger as Narlee, Walk the Prank as Nice Nancy, Raven's Home as Shannon Reynolds, David S. Pumpkins’ Halloween Special as Paige (voice) animated by Bento Box Entertainment; and Will Vs The Future as Athena, a time traveling, warrior rebel from the future. Her role in Little Fires Everywhere was called "excellent" by the New York Times, which said, "The scenes between [her mother] Mia and Pearl, both the tender and the angry ones, are the show’s highlights."

Filmography
Television 

Film

Theater

References

External links
 
 Official website

2003 births
Living people
American television actresses
American stage actresses
21st-century American actresses